Mesokristensenia is an extinct genus of moth in the family Mesokristenseniidae. It existed in what is now China during the middle Jurassic period. It was named by Huang Diying, André Nel and Joël Minet in 2010, and the type species is Mesokristensenia latipenna.

Three species were included when the family and genus were first described. The species were recovered from the Middle Jurassic Jiulongshan Formations Daohugou beds in Inner Mongolia). Mesokristenseniidae was suggested to possibly represent a sister group to Micropterigidae. Mesokristensenia differs from all extant Lepidoptera, except Agathiphaga, in that the forewings retain four median veins, a character shared with the lepidopteran sister order Trichoptera.

References

Extinct moths
†Mesokristensenia
Fossil Lepidoptera
Middle Jurassic insects
Fossil taxa described in 2010
Jurassic insects of Asia